The Treaty on Basic Relations Between Japan and the Republic of Korea (Korean: , , Hanil Gibon Joyak) was signed on June 22, 1965. It established basic diplomatic relations between Japan and South Korea.

Background
As Korea was not a signatory state of the Treaty of San Francisco, it was not entitled to the benefits of Article 14, which stipulated the reparations by Japan. However, by the provisions of Article 21 of that treaty, Korea was entitled to be an authority applied to Article 4, which stated the arrangement of property and claims.

The Treaty was the fruit of the "Korea–Japan Talks," a series of bilateral talks held between South Korea and Japan from October 1951 to June 1965 to normalize diplomatic relations. Over that period of 14 years, a total of seven talks were held.

In his 1974 Nobel Peace Prize lecture, Eisaku Satō explicitly mentioned the Treaty on Basic Relations between Japan and South Korea. He described "the guiding spirit of equality and mutual advantage and the realistic approach of seeking to establish friendship with close neighbors" as significant aspects of the extended negotiations which produced the bilateral agreement.

In October 2018, the Supreme Court of Korea issued a ruling which ordered Japanese private companies to compensate workers from the Korean peninsula who were called up to work for those companies during the Pacific War.  This ruling, along with one made about Japan's position in relation to Korean comfort woman in January 2021, was called a breach of the 1965 agreement's dispute resolution mechanism by Japan.

Terms
The treaty established "normal" diplomatic relations between the East Asian neighbors. The original documents of this agreement are kept respectively by Japan and Korea. The treaty is drafted using English, Japanese, and Korean, each of which is considered authentic. In case of a "divergence of interpretation," the English-language version is deemed to be authoritative and prevailing.

The 1965 Treaty also declared:
It is confirmed that all treaties or agreements concluded between the Empire of Japan and the Empire of Korea on or before August 22, 1910 are already null and void.

Settlements

With the Treaty, the agreements between Japan and Korea concerning the settlement of problems in regard to property and claims and economic cooperation was also signed. Japan provided South Korea with $300 million grant in economic aid and $200 million in loans together with $300 million in loans for private trust, a total of $800 million as "reparation fee" that Japan had to pay for their illegal occupation. The official policy of Japanese governments has been that, in regard to war-time property issues and individual claims for compensation, such issues were settled completely and finally by this agreement. But Korean Supreme court decided that all the charges related to individuals still are alive.

The 1965 Treaty Article II:
1 The High Contracting Parties confirm that the problems concerning property, rights, and interests of the two High Contracting Parties and their peoples (including juridical persons) and the claims between the High Contracting Parties and between their peoples, including those stipulated in Article IV(a) of the Peace Treaty with Japan signed at the city of San Francisco on September 8, 1951, have been settled completely and finally.

Use of loans and grants
The loans and grants provided to South Korea were used for the following projects. Pohang Iron and Steel Company used $88.68 million loan and $30.8 million grant, a total of $119.48 million, 23.9% of $500 million loans and grants.

Compensation
There has been a constant call from the South Korean public (and to some extent, Japanese with left or liberal political leaning) that Japan should compensate Korean individuals who suffered from Japanese colonial rule. The Japanese government has refused to do so, arguing that it settled issues on a government-to-government basis under the 1965 agreement. The South Korean government has argued that the 1965 agreement was not intended to settle individual claims against Japan for war crime or crimes against humanity as shown by documents presented during the negotiations specifically excluding claims for personal injuries incurred by Japan's violations of international laws. The U.N. Commission on Human Rights has advocated the South Korean government's perspective by defining that the comfort women issue is a matter of human rights; the 1965 treaty only regulated property claims and not personal damages.

In January 2005, the South Korean government disclosed 1,200 pages of diplomatic documents that recorded the proceeding of the treaty. The documents, kept secret for 40 years, recorded that the Japanese government actually proposed to the South Korean government to directly compensate individual victims but it was the South Korean government which insisted that it would handle individual compensation to its citizens and then received the whole amount of grants on behalf of the victims.

South Korean government demanded a total of 364 million dollars in compensation for the 1.03 million Koreans conscripted into the workforce and the military during the colonial period, at a rate of 200 dollars per survivor, 1,650 dollars per death and 2,000 dollars per injured person.
South Korea agreed to demand no further compensation, either at the government or individual level, after receiving $800 million in grants and soft loans from Japan as compensation for its 1910–45 colonial rule in the treaty.

Most of the funds from grants and loan were used for economic development, particularly on establishing social infrastructures, founding POSCO, building Gyeongbu Expressway and the Soyang Dam with the technology transfer from Japanese companies. Records also show 300,000 won per death was used to compensate victims of forced labor between 1975 and 1977.

See also
 Asian Women's Fund
 History of Japan–Korea relations
 Japan–Korea disputes
 Japan–South Korea Joint Declaration of 1998
 Japan–South Korea trade dispute

Citations

General and cited references 
 Hook, Glenn D. (2001). Japan's International Relations: Politics, Economics, and Security. London: Routledge. ; ; .
 Lundqvist, Stig, et al. (1997). Nobel Lectures, including Presentation Speeches and Laureates' Biographies. 1971-1980. Singapore: World Scientific. ; ; .

External links

 Wikisource, Treaty text in English; Japanese; Korean
 Wikisource, Agreement Between Japan and the Republic of Korea Concerning Fisheries
 Wikisource, Agreement Between Japan and the Republic of Korea Concerning the Settlement of Problems in Regard to Property and Claims and Economic Cooperation
 Wikisource, Agreement Between Japan and the Republic of Korea Concerning the Legal Status and Treatment of the People of the Republic of Korea Residing in Japan

Japan–South Korea relations
Basic relations
1965 in Japan
Basic relations
1965 in South Korea
Basic relations
Reparations
Bilateral treaties of Japan